Dallas Carl "Dal" Ward (August 11, 1906 – February 15, 1983) was an American football, basketball, and baseball player and coach.

Ward grew up in northeastern Oregon on a ranch near Lexington and played college football at Oregon Agricultural College in Corvallis in the 1920s, where he started every game of his collegiate career.

Ward held membership in five honorary societies, including Phi Kappa Phi, and was inducted into the Colorado Sports Hall of Fame in 1985. The CU athletic administration center, located at the north end of Folsom Field, was named after him. As of 2007, Ward is one of only three multi-sport inductees in the hall of fame at Oregon State, where he was inducted in 1997. He earned eight varsity letters: three for football and twice each for baseball and basketball, and was a captain in all three sports.

Coaching career
After graduation from Oregon State, Ward taught in Minneapolis and became head coach at Marshall High in 1928, helped with a letter of recommendation written by Knute Rockne. In 1936, he joined the staff at the University of Minnesota as an assistant coach. During World War II, Ward served as officer-in-charge of physical and military training at the U.S. Naval Air Station in Dallas, Texas. After the war, he returned to Minnesota as backfield coach.

Ward became the head coach at Colorado in 1948, succeeding James J. Yeager. In his first two seasons, his teams won three games each for a 6–13 record, but those were his only losing seasons.  Following the 1956 regular season, his team won the Orange Bowl, Colorado's second (1938 Cotton Bowl being their first)  bowl game, over Clemson,  After winning the season-ending bowl game, Ward was offered the head coaching positions at USC and Minnesota, but declined those offers, believing the next few years with the Buffaloes would be even better.

However, they did not turn out as hoped, and, on January 23, 1959, Ward was asked to resign by the university regents but refused. The regents reconsidered their actions, but amid many letters of protest mailed in, the original decision was kept and Ward was fired. Although no official reason was stated, it was widely believed Ward was relieved because of his inability to defeat Oklahoma; his career record against the Sooners  with the tie in 1952 in Boulder in the season opener, earning him UPI Coach of the Week honors. He retired from coaching after his firing, then returned for one season in 1962, as a defensive coach on the staff of interim head coach Bud Davis.

Ward is credited with bringing the Colorado Buffaloes football program to national prominence in  As of 2007, Ward is ranked third at Colorado in total number of games coached, fourth in total wins, and sixth in conference wins.

Later life and death
Ward had earned tenure as a CU faculty member in 1956. He chose to stay at Colorado and teach.  He and his wife Jane and their five children remained in Boulder, where he died of cancer at age 76 in 1983.

Head coaching record

References

External links
Colorado Sports Hall of Fame – Dal Ward

1906 births
1983 deaths
American football ends
Colorado Buffaloes football coaches
Iowa Pre-Flight Seahawks football coaches
Minnesota Golden Gophers football coaches
Oregon State Beavers baseball players
Oregon State Beavers football players
Oregon State Beavers men's basketball players
High school football coaches in Minnesota
United States Navy personnel of World War II
People from Morrow County, Oregon
Players of American football from Oregon
Coaches of American football from Oregon
American men's basketball players
United States Navy officers
Deaths from cancer in Colorado
Military personnel from Oregon